Riesco may refer to:

People
 Ángel Riesco Carbajo
 Armando Riesco
 Germán Ignacio Riesco
 Germán Riesco
 Iola Leal Riesco

Places
 Cordillera Riesco, mountain range
 Riesco Island

See also
 Riesco Gallery; see Croydon Clocktower